Delaney Aikens is a Canadian rugby sevens player. She won a gold medal at the 2019 Pan American Games as a member of the Canada women's national rugby sevens team.

References

External links

2000 births
Living people
Canada international rugby sevens players
Female rugby sevens players
Rugby sevens players at the 2019 Pan American Games
Pan American Games gold medalists for Canada
Pan American Games medalists in rugby sevens
Rugby sevens players at the 2018 Summer Youth Olympics
Medalists at the 2019 Pan American Games
Canada international women's rugby sevens players
Youth Olympic bronze medalists for Canada
Medalists at the 2018 Summer Youth Olympics
21st-century Canadian women